Nassau is the capital and largest city of the Bahamas. With a population of 274,400 as of 2016, or just over 70% of the entire population of the Bahamas, Nassau is commonly defined as a primate city, dwarfing all other towns in the country. It is the centre of commerce, education, law, administration, and media of the country.

The city is located on the island of New Providence.

Nassau is the site of the House of Assembly and various judicial departments and was considered historically to be a stronghold of pirates. The city was named in honour of William III of England, Prince of Orange-Nassau.

Nassau's modern growth began in the late eighteenth century, with the influx of thousands of Loyalists and their slaves to the Bahamas following the American War of Independence. Many of them settled in Nassau and eventually came to outnumber the original inhabitants.

As the population of Nassau grew, so did its populated areas. Today the city dominates the entire island and its satellite, Paradise Island. However, until the post-Second World War era, the outer suburbs scarcely existed. Most of New Providence was uncultivated bush until Loyalists were resettled there following the American Revolutionary War; they established several plantations, such as Clifton and Tusculum. Slaves were imported as labour.

After the British abolished the international slave trade in 1807, they resettled thousands of Africans liberated from slave ships by the Royal Navy on New Providence (at Adelaide Village and Gambier Village), along with other islands such as Grand Bahama, Exuma, Abaco and Inagua. In addition, slaves freed from American ships, such as the Creole case in 1841, were allowed to settle there. The largest concentration of Africans historically lived in the "Over-the-Hill" suburbs of Grants Town and Bain Town to the south of the city of Nassau, while most of the inhabitants of European descent lived on the island's northern coastal ridges.

History

The town that would be called Nassau was founded in 1670 by British noblemen who brought British settlers with them to New Providence. They built a fort, and named it Charles Town in honour of England’s King Charles II. During this time there were frequent wars with the Spanish, and Charles Town was used as a base for privateering against them.  In 1684 the town was burned to the ground during the Raid on Charles Town. It was rebuilt in 1695 under Governor Nicholas Trott and renamed Nassau in honour of King William III, who belonged to a branch of the House of Nassau. William was the Dutch Stadtholder (stadhouder in Dutch), and, from 1689, the King of England, Scotland and Ireland. The name Nassau ultimately derives from the town of Nassau in Germany.

Lacking effective governors after Trott, Nassau fell on hard times. In 1703 Spanish and French allied forces briefly occupied Nassau. More so, Nassau suffered greatly during the War of Spanish Succession and had witnessed Spanish incursions during 1703, 1704 and 1706. From 1703 to 1718 there was no legitimate governor in the colony. Thomas Walker was the island's last remaining appointed official and although evidence is scarce, it appears that he was acting in the role of deputy governor upon Benjamin Hornigold's arrival in 1713. By this time, the sparsely settled Bahamas had become a pirate haven known as New Providence. The Governor of Bermuda stated that there were over 1,000 pirates in Nassau and that they outnumbered the mere hundred inhabitants of the town. They proclaimed Nassau a pirate republic, recognising the island's prosperous state in which it offered fresh fruit, meat and water and plenty of protection amid its waterways. Nassau's harbour was tailor-made for defence and it could take around 500 vessels, though it was too shallow to accept large battleships. Benjamin Hornigold, along with his great rival Henry Jennings, became the unofficial overlord of a veritable pirate republic which played host to the self-styled Flying Gang. Other pirates that used Nassau as their base included Charles Vane, Thomas Barrow (who declared himself "Governor of New Providence"), Calico Jack Rackham, Anne Bonny, Mary Read, and the infamous Edward Teach, better known as "Blackbeard".

In 1718, the British sought to regain control of the islands and appointed Captain Woodes Rogers as Royal governor. He successfully clamped down on the pirates, reformed the civil administration, and restored commerce. Rogers cleaned up Nassau and rebuilt the fort, using his own wealth to try to overcome problems. In 1720, the Spanish attacked Nassau but failed to capture the town and the island.

During the wars in the Thirteen Colonies, Nassau experienced an economic boom. With funds from privateering, a new fort, street lights and over 2300 sumptuous houses were built and Nassau was extended. In addition to this, mosquito breeding swamps were filled.

In 1776, the Battle of Nassau resulted in a brief occupation by American Continental Marines during the American War of Independence, where the Marines staged their first amphibious raid on Fort Montague after attempting to sneak up on Fort Nassau. In 1778 after an overnight invasion, American raiders led by Captain Rathbun, left with ships, gunpowder and military stores after stopping in Nassau for only two weeks. In 1782 Spain captured Nassau for the last time when Don Juan de Cagigal, governor-general of Cuba, attacked New Providence with 5,000 men. Andrew Deveaux, an American Loyalist who resettled on the island, set forth and recaptured the island for the British Crown with just 220 men and 150 muskets to face a force of 600 trained soldiers.

Lord Dunmore governed the colony from 1787 to 1796. He oversaw the construction of Fort Charlotte and Fort Fincastle in Nassau.

During the American Civil War, Nassau served as a port for blockade runners making their way to and from ports along the southern Atlantic Coast for continued trade with the Confederacy.

In the 1920s and 1930s, Nassau profited from Prohibition in the United States.

During the Cuban Revolution of 1959, tourism was further benefitted due to the imposed restrictions on American citizens visiting Cuba. Today, Nassau's location close to the United States and ties between the U.S. and the Bahamas make it a common tourist destination.

Geography

Located on New Providence Island, Nassau's harbour has a blend of old world and colonial architecture, and a busy port. The tropical climate and natural environment of the Bahamas have made Nassau an attractive tourist destination.

Nassau developed directly behind the port area. New Providence provides 200 km2 of relatively flat and low-lying land intersected by low ridges (none of which restricted settlement). In the centre of the island there are several shallow lakes that are tidally connected.

The city's proximity to the United States (290 km (181 miles) east-southeast of Miami, Florida) has contributed to its popularity as a holiday resort, especially after the United States imposed a ban on travel to Cuba in 1963. The Atlantis resort on nearby Paradise Island accounts for more tourist arrivals to the city than any other hotel property of Nassau. The mega-resort employs over 6,000 Bahamians, and is the largest employer outside of the government.

Climate
Nassau has a tropical savanna climate (Köppen: Aw), bordering on a tropical monsoon climate (Köppen: Am), with hot wet summers, and mild dry winters. Temperatures are relatively consistent throughout the course of the year.

Urban development

During the 19th century, Nassau became urbanized, attracting rural residents. Growth since the 1950s has been outwards from the town. The 1788 heart of Nassau was just a few blocks of buildings between Government House and the harbour, but the town gradually expanded east to Malcolm's Park, south to Wulff Road, and west to Nassau Street. Grants Town and Bain Town south of the city became the main residential areas for those of African descent, and until about 30 years ago was the most populous part of the city.

Those of European descent built houses along the shore, east as far as Fort Montagu, west as far as Saunders Beach, and along the ridge edging the city. During the 20th century, the city spread east to Village Road and west to Fort Charlotte and Oakes Field. This semicircle of residential development was the main area of settlement until after the Second World War, and marks a distinct phase in the city's expansion, the outer boundary to this zone being the effective limit of the continuous built-up area. The wealthier residents continued to spread east (to East End Point) and West (to Lyford Cay).

In the last 40 years, residential development has been quite different. It has consisted mainly of planned middle-income sub-divisions. Since the 1960s, government has sponsored low-cost housing developments at Yellow Elder, Elizabeth Estates, and Pinewood Gardens, in the outer ring.

City centre

The city centre is the hub for all activities in Nassau. Thousands of people visit daily, to shop, dine, sightsee and to enjoy the tropical climate of the city. While the busiest part of central city is the Bay Street thoroughfare and the Woodes Rogers Walk, located across the street from the port and parallel to Bay, the area extends for several blocks in each direction. It starts at West Bay, around the Junkanoo Beach area. A few hotels and restaurants are located on West Bay.

The next landmark is the British Colonial Hotel, which marks the beginning of Bay Street proper. Pirates of Nassau Museum is just across from the British Colonial Hilton. The next few blocks of Bay Street are wall-to-wall boutiques, with a few restaurants and clubs interspersed throughout the retailers.

Historical landmarks are also in the vicinity, including Vendue House, Christ Church Cathedral, and the Nassau Public Library. Although the tourist part of the city centre peters out after about seven blocks, smaller, more local shops are located down Bay Street. At this point, Bay Street becomes East Bay.

The Straw Market is a tourist destination in the city centre. A new market was opened in 2011 after a fire in 2001 destroyed the original Fish, Vegetable and Straw Market. The market is open on all sides, and contains a number of Bahamian craft stores.

Cable Beach

Cable Beach is recognized as the hotel district of Nassau. Five hotels—two of which are all-inclusive—are located on this strip.  The area is also known for its dining, with most of the area's restaurants located in the hotels or across the street. There is a bit of shopping, most of it located in the Wyndham and at Baha Mar. In 2017, the development of Baha Mar, a luxury resort and casino, brought more than 2,000 hotel rooms and the largest gaming and convention facility in the Caribbean to this section of New Providence Island.

Demographics

Nassau had a population of 128,420 females and 117,909 males and was home to 70,222 households with an average family size of 3.5 according to the 2010 census. Nassau's large population in relation to the remainder of the Bahamas is the result of waves of immigration from the Family Islands to the capital. Consequently, this has led to the decline in the population of the lesser developed islands and the rapid growth of Nassau.

Public safety

In January 2018, the U.S. Department of State issued the latest in a series of travel advisories due to violent crime.

Transport

Air
Lynden Pindling International Airport (formerly Nassau International Airport) is located on the western side of Nassau. New Providence Airport on Paradise Island was closed in 1999 with runway removed and integrated into the resort on the island.

Water
Ferries (boats) provide water travel around Nassau to the surrounding islands, namely Paradise Island. Prince George Wharf is the main port in the city that serves cruise ships with ports of call in Nassau. Transportation and shipping around the Family Islands is primarily through mailboats based at Potters Cay. International shipping is done through the Arawak Port Department on Arawak Cay. High speed excursions to Exuma, Spanish Wells and Harbour Island are available daily.

Roads

Public jitney buses and taxis provide transport in and around Nassau. Rental cars are also available in the city and at the airport.

Major roads in Nassau include:
Bay Street
Eastern Road
Baillou Hill Road (Pronounced "Blue Hill Road" by locals)
East Street
Adelaide Road
Shirley Street
Soldier Road
Carmicheal Road
Prince Charles Drive
John F Kennedy Drive
Fox Hill Road
Wulff Road
Robinson Road

The major road in Nassau is Bay Street for tourists. Bay Street runs the entire length of the Island from East to West. Bay Street also provides beachfront views. The downtown area and the cruise ships are in walking distance.

The Bahamas is a left-hand traffic country, but many cars are imported from the US and are left-hand drive.

Culture

UNESCO Creative Cities Network

Nassau has been recognized as a part of the UNESCO Creative Cities Network as a city of Crafts and Folk Art. It is one of only three Caribbean cities to receive this honour.

Junkanoo

The city's chief festival is Junkanoo, an energetic, colourful street parade of brightly costumed people dancing to the rhythmic accompaniment of cowbells, drums and whistles. The word 'Junkanoo' is derived from the name of the founder: John Kanoo. The celebration occurs on December 26, July 10 and January 1, beginning in the early hours of the morning (1:00 a.m.) and ending around 10 a.m.  At the end of the Junkanoo procession, judges award cash prizes for the best music, costumes, and overall group presentation.  Participants spend all year preparing their handmade costumes by using coloured crepe paper and cardboard.

In popular culture
Nassau was the main setting for the Starz Network show Black Sails (2014-2017). However, filming was based in South Africa

Nassau was featured as an important setting in several movies, including the Beatles film Help! and the James Bond films Thunderball (1965), Never Say Never Again (1983), and Casino Royale (2006). Nassau has also served as a shooting location for film production. In 1981, Nassau was used as a stand-in for Greece in an ocean scene in For Your Eyes Only.

Several other late-20th- and 21st-century movies have been set here, including After the Sunset, Into the Blue (2005), and Flipper (1996).

It hosted the Miss Universe 2009 pageant.

Nassau was featured as a primary setting in the 2013 video game Assassin's Creed IV: Black Flag (2013).

Nassau Town is mentioned in "Sloop John B", a Bahamian folk song. Since the early 1950s there have been many recordings of the song, the best known being by The Beach Boys on their Pet Sounds album.

Nassau is the subject of "Funky Nassau," a song written by Ray Munnings and Tyrone Fitzgerald and recorded by the Nassau-based funk band The Beginning of the End in 1971 as the single from their album of the same name. The song reached #7 on the US R&B chart, #15 on the Billboard Hot 100, and #31 on the UK Singles Chart in 1971.

Twin towns – sister cities
Nassau's sister cities are:
Detroit, Michigan, United States
Winston-Salem, North Carolina, United States

Notable residents
Derrick Atkins (born 1984), World champ sprint Medalist specializing in the 100m
Deandre Ayton (born 1998), NBA basketball player for the Phoenix Suns. First overall pick in the 2018 NBA Draft.
Andretti Bain (born 1985), Olympic sprint Medalist specializing in the 400m
Lakindes Brown (born 1987), Bahamian beauty queen
Jazz Chisholm Jr. (born 1998), Major League Baseball shortstop for the Miami Marlins
Sean Connery (1930–2020), Scottish actor, best known for his role as James Bond in seven films
Kyle Edmund (born 1995), British professional tennis player
Nick Kyrgios (born 1995), Australian professional tennis player
Kevin Ferguson aka "Kimbo Slice" (1974-2016), mixed martial artist, boxer, bare-knuckle boxer, professional wrester
Christopher Larson (born 1991), international footballer
Nathaniel McKinney (born 1982), World champ relay sprint Medalist specializing in the 400m
Ramon Miller (born 1987), Olympic sprint Medalist specializing in the 400m
Shaunae Miller-Uibo (born 1994), Olympic sprint Medalist specializing in the 400m and 200m
Hubert Minnis (born 1954), Politician
Avard Moncur (born 1978), Olympic sprint Medalist specializing in the 400m
Mike Oldfield (born 1953), English musician
Sidney Poitier (1927–2022), Bahamian-American actor, film director, author, and diplomat
Antoan Richardson (born 1983), Bahamian Major League Baseball outfielder and coach
Denis Shapovalov (born 1999), Canadian tennis player
Tonique Williams-Darling (born 1976), Olympic sprint Medalist specializing in the 400m
Lexi Wilson (born 1991), Bahamian model and beauty pageant titleholder

See also

Ardastra Gardens, Zoo and Conservation Centre
List of Caribbean Cities and Towns by population
Nassau Public Library

References

External links

Official website for Bahamas Government

 
Capitals in the Caribbean
New Providence
Piracy in the Caribbean
Populated places established in the 17th century
Populated places in the Bahamas
Port cities in the Caribbean
Pirate dens and locations
17th-century establishments in North America
1695 establishments in the British Empire